According to the Hebrew Bible, Potipherah (Pōṭī feraʿ) was a priest of the ancient Egyptian town of On, mentioned in the  and . He was the father of Asenath, who was given to Joseph as his wife by Pharaoh, and who bore Joseph two sons: Manasseh and Ephraim.

His name means "he whom Ra has given".

Biblical source

Theories 
It has been suggested that Potipherah was a prince, not only a priest. A Jewish legend makes him the same person as Potiphar, whose wife was in love with Joseph and whose false accusation got him thrown in prison.

References 

Ancient Egyptian priests
Book of Genesis people
Joseph (Genesis)